Yoshio Kimura may refer to:

, Japanese politician
, Japanese shogi player